Phil Groeneveld (born September 18, 1974) is a Canadian-Dutch retired professional ice hockey goaltender. He last played for HC Alleghe in Italy's Serie A league, and retired in 2009.

Career 
Born in Oshawa, Ontario, Groeneveld has played for clubs in France, the Netherlands, and Italy.  A ,  goaltender, Groeneveld attended Ohio State University for a brief time however began his pro career in the United States in 1995 with the Wichita Thunder. Later in the same season he joined the Fort Worth Fire, also of the CHL where he scored the first ever goalie goal in league history. The following season he joined French club Viry-Châtillon EH where he remained for two years before joining a second French team, Rouen HE 76, for whom he played the next four seasons where he won two championships, two top goaltender awards and scored another goalie goal.

Groeneveld spent 2003-5 with Amsterdam Bulldogs again winning two championships while suffering an ACL injury. For 2005-6 he played for SV Renon in Serie A in Italy assisting the club to the league final for the first time in 32 years.  Groeneveld spent 2006-07 playing 5 games for Riviere-du-Loup CIMT of the CQSHL, and 33 games for HC Alleghe in Serie A. For 2007-8 he played for Hockey Club Bolzano Foxes in Serie A Italie where he won another championship. In 2008-9 he played for HC Alleghe. 

Groeneveld was a member of the Netherlands National Team from 2004-10 winning two top goaltender awards in World Championships and a Bronze medal. Amazingly, Groeneveld scored a third goalie goal in an exhibition game between France and the Netherlands.

International 
Groeneveld plays internationally for the Netherlands national ice hockey team.  In 2005 he played for the Netherlands national team for the first time, in Olympic qualifying and the 2005 World Championships (Division 1) winning a bronze medal.  In 2005 and in 2007 Groeneveld won best goaltender award of the World Championships.

Sources

1974 births
Amsterdam Bulldogs players
Bolzano HC players
Canadian ice hockey goaltenders
Canadian people of Dutch descent
Dutch ice hockey goaltenders
Eredivisie (ice hockey) players
Fort Worth Fire players
HC Alleghe players
Ice hockey people from Ontario
Living people
Rouen HE 76 players
Sportspeople from Oshawa
Ritten Sport players
TYSC Trappers players
Viry-Châtillon EH players
Wichita Thunder players
Canadian expatriate ice hockey players in the Netherlands
Canadian expatriate ice hockey players in France
Canadian expatriate ice hockey players in Italy
Canadian expatriate ice hockey players in the United States
Naturalised citizens of the Netherlands